Shiga Prefecture is a prefecture of Japan.

Shiga may also refer to:

Places
 Shiga District, Shiga, a former district of Shiga Prefecture
 Shiga, Shiga, a former town of Shiga Prefecture
 Shiga Kōgen, a highland of Nagano Prefecture, Japan

Other uses
 Shiga (surname), a Japanese surname
 Shiga toxin, a biological toxin

See also

 Shiga Lin, a singer and actress from Hong Kong
 Shigashi (Lady Shiga), a Japanese noble lady and warrior
Toshiyuki Shiga, a Japanese business executive
 Shika, Ishikawa, a town in Ishikawa Prefecture, Japan
 Shikanoshima, an island of Fukuoka Prefecture, Japan